Jimmy Rolland was a Scottish football forward who spent four seasons in the American Soccer League. He was the 1978 league leading scorer and MVP.

In 1974, he signed for Northwich Victoria from Buxton. In his first season for Northwich, he scored 45 goals in 56 games; only two other Northwich players have better records in the club's history. However the lure of the growing football scene in the USA saw him sign for the Los Angeles Skyhawks in the American Soccer League. Despite being on the LA Skyhawks' books, he returned to Northwich in 1976, scoring a vital goal in the club's best modern-time FA Cup run.

In the same season, his team, LA Skyhawks won the league championship and Rolland was the team and league's second leading scorer. In 1978, he led the league with 17 goals in 24 games, leading to his selection as league MVP.

In 1980 he was contracted to play with ASL expansion team the Phoenix Fire, but the team folded in pre-season.

In 1980, he played for the California Sunshine.

He then played for the San Francisco Fog during the 1980-1981 Major Indoor Soccer League season.

References

External links
 MISL stats

American Soccer League (1933–1983) players
Buxton F.C. players
California Sunshine players
Scottish footballers
Scottish expatriate footballers
Los Angeles Skyhawks players
Major Indoor Soccer League (1978–1992) players
Northwich Victoria F.C. players
San Francisco Fog (MISL) players
Living people
1945 births
Association football forwards
Scottish expatriate sportspeople in the United States
Expatriate soccer players in the United States
Footballers from Kirkcaldy
Phoenix Fire (soccer) players